April Macie is an American comedian, television personality, writer, and actress. She won Howard Stern's "Hottest and Funniest Chick" contest and appeared in the fourth season of NBC's reality series Last Comic Standing.

Early years
Macie was born and raised in Easton, Pennsylvania, before moving to Florida after high school.

Career

Macie has been to over 68 countries, 16 of those performing stand-up comedy with the USO. She was a finalist on NBC's Last Comic Standing in 2006.  Macie has appeared on E! Entertainment, Fuel TV, HSN, Sirius and XM Radio.  Programs she has been on include Bob & Tom, Access Hollywood, and The Todd and Tyler Radio Empire, and she was labeled an "emerging talent to watch" by The Hollywood Reporter at the Just for Laughs Comedy Festival in 2005. In the early summer of 2006, she auditioned for Last Comic Standing and was accepted into the show's cast, but she was voted out in the initial round of competition. Macie is a regular guest on the Howard Stern Show, where in 2008 she was voted the "Funniest and Hottest" comedian in America.  She has appeared on Showtime in the documentary, I Am Comic which premiered at the 2010 Slamdance Film Festival and in the stand-up special Vegas Is My Oyster premiering August 5.  Macie was a featured performer in Snoop Dogg Presents The Bad Girls of Comedy which aired on Showtime in 2012. Macie performed on Episode 5 of the Netflix Series, Tiffany Haddish Presents: They Ready in 2019.
Currently, she spends most of her time traveling the United States as a headlining stand-up comedian.

30th AVN Awards
On January 19, 2013 Macie co-hosted the XXX AVN Awards alongside 2013 Female Performer of the Year Asa Akira, and AVN Hall of Fame inductee Jesse Jane.

Filmography
 Tiffany Haddish Presents: They Ready (2019), as herself
 Comedy Underground with Dave Attell (2014), as herself
 Snoop Dogg Presents: The Bad Girls of Comedy (2012), as herself
 A Guy Walks Into a Bar (2011), Girl
 The Naughty Show (2011) – Episode #1.37, as herself
 Pauly Shore's Vegas Is My Oyster (2011), as herself
 I Am Comic (2010), as herself
 Road to Hollywood (2009), as herself
 April & Christina (2008), April
 Last Comic Standing (2006) – Episodes #4.1 and #4.5, as herself

References

External links
 
 

1976 births
Living people
21st-century American women
21st-century American comedians
American agnostics
American people of Polish descent
American stand-up comedians
American women comedians
Last Comic Standing contestants
Comedians from Pennsylvania
Writers from Easton, Pennsylvania